PRRM may refer to:

Philippine Rural Reconstruction Movement in the Philippines.
Patnam Rajender Reddy Memorial Engineering College in India.